The third season of Cobra Kai, stylized as COBRA KAIII, was released on Netflix on January 1, 2021, and consisted of 10 episodes. The series is a direct sequel to the original four films in The Karate Kid franchise, focusing on the characters of Daniel LaRusso and Johnny Lawrence over 30 years after the original film. This is the first season to be released on Netflix after YouTube decided to sell the series following the first two seasons. YouTube ordered the season in 2019 and initially set a 2020 release date which was delayed after Netflix's acquisition.

There were nine starring roles throughout the season which also featured guest actors returning to the franchise portraying characters from the first and second films. A soundtrack featuring music from the season was also released in January 2021. The season was met with positive reviews from critics. The season also received numerous award nominations including an Emmy nomination for Outstanding Comedy Series. It is considered an international success ranking on Netflix's top ten list in 85 countries and reaching 45 million viewers within the first four months of its release.

Cast and characters

Main
 Ralph Macchio as Daniel LaRusso
 William Zabka as Johnny Lawrence
 Courtney Henggeler as Amanda LaRusso
 Xolo Maridueña as Miguel Diaz
 Tanner Buchanan as Robby Keene
 Mary Mouser as Samantha LaRusso
 Jacob Bertrand as Eli "Hawk" Moskowitz
 Gianni DeCenzo as Demetri Alexopoulos
 Martin Kove as John Kreese

Recurring
 Aedin Mincks as Mitch
 Vanessa Rubio as Carmen Diaz
 Khalil Everage as Chris
 Owen Morgan as Bert
 Hannah Kepple as Moon
 Annalisa Cochrane as Yasmine
 Joe Seo as Kyler Park
 Nathaniel Oh as Nathaniel
 Peyton List as Tory Nichols
 Okea Eme-Akwari as Shawn Payne
 Barrett Carnahan as young Kreese
 Nick Marini as young Terry Silver
 Terry Serpico as Captain Turner

Notable guests
 Bret Ernst as Louie LaRusso Jr.
 Diora Baird as Shannon Keene
 David Shatraw as Tom Cole
 Ed Asner as Sid Weinberg
 Ron Thomas as Bobby Brown
 Dan Ahdoot as Anoush
 Ken Davitian as Armand Zarkarian
 Yuji Okumoto as Chozen Toguchi
 Tamlyn Tomita as Kumiko
 Dee Snider as himself
 Traci Toguchi as Yuna
 Griffin Santopietro as Anthony LaRusso
 Elisabeth Shue as Ali Mills

Episodes

Production

Development
YouTube renewed Cobra Kai for a third season in May 2019. The following year, Sony Pictures Television, the series distribution company, was looking to move the series to a different platform ahead of the season's release. At the time, it was said that YouTube was willing to release the third season but was not interested in renewing it for a fourth because the platform changed its model from streaming video on demand to advertising-based video on demand and as a result was shifting its focus from scripted programming to unscripted. Netflix and Hulu were named as potential buyers for the season. In June 2020, the series was moving to Netflix. Josh Heald, Jon Hurwitz, and Hayden Schlossberg returned as executive producers for the season through their production company, Counterbalance Entertainment, while Will Smith, James Lassiter, and Caleeb Pinkett served as executive produced through the Overbrook Entertainment production company. In addition, series stars Macchio and Zabka were co-executive producers. Ahead of the third season's release, Netflix renewed the series for a fourth season.

Casting
The season featured nine starring roles, all of which returned from the previous season. Peyton List continued to recur as Tory Nichols, a character introduced in the second season, and often appeared alongside the main cast in promotional events, material, and interviews. Elisabeth Shue returned to the franchise in a two-episode story arc reprising her role as Ali Mills from The Karate Kid. The Karate Kid Part II actors Ron Thomas, Tamlyn Tomita, Traci Toguchi, and Yuji Okumoto also returned during the season reprising their roles as Bobby, Kumiko, Yuna, and Chozen Toguchi, respectively. Actress Nichole Brown confirmed that she would not be returning to the series as Aisha Robinson after recurring throughout the first two seasons because the writers couldn't fit her into the story. Jon Hurwitz later stated in an interview that he was open to having the character appear in a later season. Paul Walter Hauser, who played Raymond "Stingray" in the previous season, was intended to return, but his commitments with Cruella, which was being filmed overseas, prevented him from reprising the role, as the film was shot concurrently to this season. Singer-songwriter Dee Snider guest starred in one episode performing as the band Twisted Sister.

Filming
Filming on the season was complete in 2019 prior to the series acquisition by Netflix. Principal photography for the season took place in Atlanta, Georgia. Additional locations included a two-day filming block in Okinawa, Japan. The house where the character Daniel LaRusso and his family lives is located in Marietta, Georgia, and was featured on an episode of HGTV's My Big Amazing Renovation. Some filming also took place in Los Angeles, California, where the series is set, and surrounding suburbs.

Music
Featured music throughout the season primarily highlighted music from the 1980s. Guest star Dee Snider performed the song "I Wanna Rock".

Soundtrack

Madison Gate Records released a digital soundtrack album on January 8, 2021, entitled Cobra Kai: Season 3 (Soundtrack from the Netflix Original Series), to accompany the third season. A 2-CD Deluxe Edition soundtrack, featuring 19 additional bonus tracks, was released by La-La Land Records on January 19. Leo Birenberg and Zach Robinson continued to serve as composers for the third season. Birenbeng and Robinson stated in an interview that they wished to bring an eighties feel to the soundtrack and took inspiration from bands such as X Japan and DragonForce. The track "Miyagi Metal" incorporated themes from the original Karate Kid soundtrack, composed by Bill Conti.

Track listing

Marketing and release
YouTube initially slated the season for a 2020 release. After the series was sold to Netflix the first two seasons were released on the streaming platform in late 2020 with the third season to be released at a "later date". As part of the move, the first two seasons remained available to stream to subscribers of YouTube Premium. Originally to be released on January 8, 2021, this date was changed to January 1, coinciding with New Year's Day.

Reception

Critical response

On the review aggregator website Rotten Tomatoes, the season holds a 90% approval rating with an average rating of 8 out of 10 based on 51 reviews. On Metacritic, the season has a weighted average score of 72 out of 100, based on reviews from 15 critics, indicating "generally favorable reviews." 
CNNs Brian Lowry wrote that the third season "kicks up the nostalgia factor into an even higher gear while remaining every bit as soapy, playful and disarmingly funny". Jen Chaney of Vulture held a similar opinion writing that the series feeds to Generation X nostalgia but that the season also provided an underlying theme that nostalgia is toxic. Saidat Giwa-Osagie with Radio Times said the episodes during the season were the most comedic so far and that the finale episode resolved more than the preceding two finales. Meanwhile, IGNs Matt Fowler opined that the season "achieves a resoundingly fun balance between triumphant and corny". Alex McLevy, writing for The A.V. Club, felt that some plotlines were planned poorly but that the season returned to its basic themes leading to an enjoyable season. Entertainment Weekly writer Darren Franich held a slightly dissenting opinion saying that the season wasn't Cobra Kais best but that the episodes remained satisfying. Franich also wrote that Nichole Brown's absence in the season led to an "uneasy representational tilt". Melanie McFarland from Salon also felt the season declined from the previous two but still referred to it as a worthwhile viewing experience. Paul Tassi, a senior contributor for Forbes, said that the season "continues to defy the odds" by wrapping up previous plot points from The Karate Kid but also making continuous progress on new storylines. The Telegraph Ed Power wrote in a similar review that the series will please the older and younger generations.

Awards and nominations
Following the season's release the series was nominated for Favorite Family TV Show at the 2021 Kids' Choice Awards on Nickelodeon, but the award was lost to Netflix's Stranger Things. For the 2021 MTV Movie & TV Awards, the series received a nomination for Best Show while a fight scene in the final episode earned a Best Fight nomination. Both awards were lost to WandaVision on Disney+. At the 27th Screen Actors Guild Awards, the season picked up a nomination for Outstanding Performance by a Stunt Ensemble in a Television Series which was lost to The Mandalorian, also on Disney+. During the 1st Hollywood Critics Association TV Awards the series gained a nomination for Best Streaming Series, Comedy. This nomination was ultimately awarded to Apple TV+'s Ted Lasso although Cobra Kai was granted an honorary award during the ceremony, known as the Legacy Award. An Outstanding Comedy Series nomination was gained for the 73rd Primetime Emmy Awards. Meanwhile, the finale episode, "December 19", picked up an additional three nominations from the 73rd Primetime Creative Arts Emmy Awards. These nominations included Outstanding Sound Editing for a Comedy or Drama Series (Half-Hour) and Animation, Outstanding Sound Mixing for a Comedy or Drama Series (Half-Hour) and Animation, and Outstanding Stunt Performance. Each of these awards were lost to Netflix's Love, Death & Robots, Ted Lasso, and The Mandalorian, respectively. Three other nominations for The Show of 2021, The Drama Show of 2021, and The Bingeworthy Show of 2021 were all received for the 2021 People's Choice Awards, which were lost to Loki, Grey's Anatomy, and Squid Game, respectively.

Viewing figures
Netflix reported in Januars 2021 that the series was on track for over 41 million households to have seen at least some of the season within the first 28 days of its release. This caused the series to become the number one overall title on Netflix in 28 countries and holding a top ten slot in 85 countries. In addition, Cobra Kai was pushed to the top spot on two of Nielsen's weekly top ten lists for subscription-based platforms, the series held the top spot on the Top 10 Programs Overall and Top 10 Originals lists for the week of January 4–10, 2021. By the end of the first quarter in April, the total number of households had risen to 45 million.

Notes

References

2021 American television seasons
Cobra Kai